Ikonz is a national entertainment magazine published in the United Kingdom. It was a print magazine between 2006 and 2011.

Background
The publication was launched as a regional monthly glossy in December 2006 by AEM Worldwide. Its official national UK launch took place in February 2007.

Ikonz caters for young British Asians, focusing on the film and music industry in both Hollywood and Bollywood. The magazine also carries mainstream British celebrity gossip, fashion and entertainment stories throughout.

Content
Ikonz is primarily aimed at British Asian women, although not as directly as in other Asian magazines. Initially, the publication balanced editorial for both male and female audiences with distinct urban influences. Following a revamp in September 2007, a large portion of the magazine adopted a more female orientated theme with equal coverage afforded to mainstream content.

A series of high-profile mainstream interviews, including exclusives with Halle Berry, Jessica Alba, and Jennifer Lopez, have encouraged the growth of the publication. These, along with Brit-Asian and urban interviews such as Boyz II Men, Keisha White, Richard Blackwood, Jay Sean and 50 Cent, have allowed the publication to increase its appeal

However, the magazine's key south Asian content remains in the form of Bollywood interviews with A-list artists including Amitabh Bachchan, Shah Rukh Khan, Shilpa Shetty, Aishwarya Rai and Bipasha Basu. In July 2007, it ran special coverage of the IIFA awards. Also featured heavily are British Bhangra artists.

Ikonz is the only British Asian publication to have regular contributions from mainstream celebrities. In October 2007, actors Kevin Sacre, Ricky Whittle and Sam Darbyshire from television soap Hollyoaks appeared in a special Halloween photo feature for the magazine, alongside presenters from the BBC Asian Network. The feature was reproduced by national publications including the Daily Star and More (magazine).

The magazine took the step to support glamour model Katie Price in November 2007, following the publication in Heat (magazine) of an offensive sticker mocking Price's son Harvey.

Personnel
The editor of Ikonz is Reena Combo, with Adam Yosef as the sub editor.

The magazine's editorial team includes editorial assistants, contributors, international correspondents and freelance writers and photographers.

New Media
Ikonz magazine is complemented by a website, an online video channel, a blog and online profiles including myspace and facebook.
These mediums are edited by the Ikonz New Media Team and are an online interpretation of the magazine's style and 'personality'. In September 2007, the magazine launched a television advertising campaign.

In February 2011, Ikonz magazine was relaunched as an online-only format, rebranded as 'Ikonz World'.

Charity

In December 2007, Ikonz donated Christmas gifts to the Birmingham Children's Hospital.

Recognition

In December 2007, Ikonz became the only ethnic partner for Clothes Show Live.
In December 2007, the magazine became an official partner of the Asian Style Awards, due to be held in 2008.
In November 2007, editor Reena Combo was nominated by the Institute of Asian Business (IAB), a division of the Birmingham Chamber of Commerce, as Outstanding Woman in Business 2007.
In August 2007, Ikonz joined forces with Madame Tussauds to select the next Bollywood star to appear at the London attraction.
In June 2007, Ikonz was appointed an official partner to the IIFA awards, held in Yorkshire.

References
Ikonz to return in February as online magazine - BizAsia, January 2011
New heroes in a house of wax - Financial Times, January 2008
'Torchwood's success is down to Cardiff' - South Wales Echo, January 2008
Salman Khan immortalized at Madame Tussauds - The Asian News, January 2008
 Disparate colours of racism - Hindustan Times, January 2008
Multi-faith Santas bear gifts for Children's Hospital - Ethnic Now, December 2007
Presents donated to children's hospital - Asian Age, December 2007
Jordan Complains Over Heat Magazine - Sky News, November 2007
Heat magazine apologises to Jordan for using disabled son on sticker - Times Online, November 2007
X Factor boyband Boys II Men slam Simon Cowell - Showbiz Spy, November 2007
Boyz II Men: We're not scared of Cowell - Digital Spy, November 2007
Ikonz only ethnic partner of Clothes Show Live - Clickwalla, November 2007
Ikonz only ethnic partner of Clothes Show Live - Ethnic Now, November 2007
Ikonz Magazine Backs Jordan’s Complaint Against Heat - Simply Bhangra, November 2007
Bollywood star to be immortalised in Madame Tussauds London after winning poll - Madame Tussauds, October 2007
Ikonz Halloween Special - Channel 4, October 2007
Hollyoaks' Halloween Ikonz! - Channel 4, October 2007
Ikonz mag dresses up for Halloween - Asians in Media, October 2007
Ikonz magazine goes in for new look - BizAsia, September 2007
Many Asians 'do not feel British' - BBC News, July 2007
Richard Blackwood in Bollywood debut - Black UK Online, May 2007
Bollywood star unveiled at Madame Tussauds - Wikinews, April 2007
‘Asian Heat’ secures nationwide distribution - Press Gazette, March 2007
Ikonz, the new Asian entertainment mag gets launched - Asians in Media, March 2007
Big Brother star meets Tony Blair, February 2007

External links
Ikonz magazine myspace
Ikonz magazine video channel

Defunct magazines published in the United Kingdom
Entertainment magazines published in the United Kingdom
Magazines established in 2006
Magazines disestablished in 2011
Mass media in Birmingham, West Midlands
Monthly magazines published in the United Kingdom
Online magazines published in the United Kingdom
Online magazines with defunct print editions